John Thynne Howe, 2nd Baron Chedworth (18 February 1714 – 9 May 1762) was an English peer and the eldest son of John Howe, 1st Baron Chedworth.

Education
He was educated at John Roysse's Free School in Abingdon, (now Abingdon School). He later studied at Pembroke College, Oxford.

Peerage
He succeeded to the title in 1742 on the death of his father, and married on 23 September 1751, Martha Parker-a-Morley-Long, daughter of Sir Philip Parker-a-Morley-Long, 3rd Baronet of Arwarton, Suffolk.

The family seat was Stowell Park, Gloucestershire, and his London residence was 25 Leicester Square.

There were no children from his marriage and he was succeeded in the barony by his younger brother Henry Frederick Howe, 3rd Baron Chedworth.

Career
He was the Lord Lieutenant of Gloucestershire and Constable of St.Briavel's (1758).

He was a breeder of thoroughbred racehorses.

See also
 List of Old Abingdonians

References

1714 births
1762 deaths
2
Lord-Lieutenants of Gloucestershire
People educated at Abingdon School